Obj or OBJ may refer to:

Object file, an organized machine code file created by a compiler with .obj file extension
Relocatable Object Module Format, an Object file for Intel microprocessors with .obj file extension
Wavefront .obj file, a 3D geometry definition file format with .obj file extension
OBJ (programming language), a programming language family developed in 1976, including OBJ2 and OBJ3
, a replacement character used in computing
Odell Beckham Jr., NFL wide receiver who formerly played for the New York Giants, Cleveland Browns and the Los Angeles Rams, nicknamed OBJ
Olusegun Obasanjo, 5th and 12th President of Nigeria, nicknamed OBJ
Ottawa Business Journal, a weekly business publication in Ottawa, Ontario, Canada